Patrick Brett O'Sullivan (August 11, 1887 – November 10, 1978) was a U.S. Representative from Connecticut.

Born in Derby, Connecticut, O'Sullivan attended public schools.
He graduated from Yale University in 1908, from Georgetown University, Washington, D.C., in 1909, and from Yale Law School in 1913.
He was admitted to the bar in 1913 and commenced practice in Derby.
He was the Corporation counsel of Derby from 1914 to 1917.
He served as delegate to the Democratic National Convention in 1916.
He served as member of the State senate and was its minority leader in 1917.
In 1918, during the First World War, he resigned from the State senate to enlist in the United States Navy.

O'Sullivan was elected as a Democrat to the Sixty-eighth Congress (March 4, 1923 – March 3, 1925).
He was an unsuccessful candidate for reelection in 1924 to the Sixty-ninth Congress.
He then resumed the practice of law and served as associate professor of law at the Yale Law School.
He served as judge of the Connecticut Superior Court from 1931–1950, associate justice of Connecticut Supreme Court 1950-1957, and chief justice in 1957, serving from April 9 to August 11 of that year, when he reached the mandatory retirement age.
He continued serving as a State trial referee in New Haven.
He was co-chairman of the Constitutional Convention in 1965.
He resided in Orange, Connecticut, where he died on November 10, 1978.
He was interred in St. Lawrence Cemetery, West Haven, Connecticut.

References

External links
 

1887 births
1978 deaths
Democratic Party members of the United States House of Representatives from Connecticut
Yale Law School alumni
Georgetown University alumni
United States Navy personnel of World War I
Democratic Party Connecticut state senators
Connecticut state court judges
20th-century American judges
Justices of the Connecticut Supreme Court
20th-century American politicians